Thuduwage Kumara (born 4 October 1990) is a Sri Lankan cricketer. He made his first-class debut for Sri Lanka Army Sports Club in the 2015–16 Premier League Tournament on 26 December 2015.

References

External links
 

1990 births
Living people
Sri Lankan cricketers
Sri Lanka Army Sports Club cricketers